Dragoraj  is a village in the municipality of Ribnik, Republika Srpska, Bosnia and Herzegovina.

References

Populated places in Ribnik
Villages in Republika Srpska